Walton Studios, previously named Hepworth Studios and Nettlefold Studios, was a film production studio in Walton-on-Thames in Surrey, England. Hepworth was a pioneering studio in the early 20th century and released the first film adaptation of Alice's Adventures in Wonderland (Alice in Wonderland, 1903).

The decline of the British cinematic production industry in the mid-20th century led to a decline in work for the facility, and after failing to financially survive as a television production outlet it was eventually closed in 1961. The studio was subsequently demolished and the land was sold for house-building.

History
Cecil Hepworth leased a house for £36 per annum in Hurst Grove, Walton-on-Thames in 1899 and established Hepworth Studios. The film recording studio he built included electric lighting and a film laboratory. Along with his cousin Monty Wicks, Hepworth created the filmmaking production company Hepwix, and began producing actualities, which were newsreel-like short documentary films. A 15 ft by 8 ft stage was also constructed in the house's back garden. By the turn of the 20th century Hepworth was making 100 films a year.

By 1905, Hepworth built a larger glass stage and began producing trick films as well as filmed material in other genres. In 1907 the studio was wrecked by a fire, which killed a member of staff. The studio continued production through World War I, producing short propaganda films to support the war-effort. During the early stages of the First World War, the studios were used to make films featuring the American star Florence Turner.

In 1923 Cecil Hepworth's Hepworth Picture Plays company which operated at the studio declared bankruptcy, due in part to the increasing competition from rival film companies. All of the original film negatives in Hepworth's possession were melted down by the receiver in order to sell the constituent silver, and thus Hepworth's entire back catalogue of 2,000 films was destroyed, a historical disaster in which 80% of British films made between 1900 and 1929 were lost for ever.

Nettlefold Studios
In 1926, the studio was purchased by Archibald Nettlefold, and renamed as Nettlefold Studios, and began producing comedy silent films, until it was upgraded to sound production with the advent of sound film in the early 1930s. The 1930s saw the studio mainly producing what were known in the industry as "Quota Quickies", an inadvertent consequence of the provisions in the Cinematograph Films Act 1927 that were intended to protect Britain's cinematic production industry from the commercial threat of Hollywood films.

During World War II the studio's buildings were requisitioned and used as a storage facility for the war-effort by the Government, and the Vickers-Armstrong Aircraft Company built two new aircraft construction hangars on the site, to reinforce and disperse its production capacity after damage by enemy bombing attacks at its factory site at Brooklands, Weybridge on 4 September 1940. Archibald Nettlefold died in 1944, and when the studio reopened after the war it was sold in 1947 to Ernest G. Roy.

The declining post-war British film industry meant that only a few domestic films were made there in the late 1940s/1950's on modest budgets. To keep the studio afloat financially and to maintain its operation, an 'open door' hiring policy was initiated, where the studio's facilities were made available to hire for non-sited companies, which led to a contract being signed with Columbia Pictures, and American actors working in the Studio's facilities including eminent film figures such as Douglas Fairbanks Jr., Bette Davis, and Rock Hudson.

Walton Studios
In 1955 Sapphire Films, owned by the American producer Hannah Weinstein, rented the Studio, and subsequently bought it from Ernest R. Roy, renaming them as The Walton Studios. Sapphire Films productions at the facility, all shown on ITV, began with The Adventures of Robin Hood (143 episodes) in the late 1950s for Lew Grade's ITC. Other Sapphire/ITC television series were also produced on the site, including The Adventures of Sir Lancelot (1956), The Buccaneers (1956), Sword of Freedom (1957) and The Four Just Men (1959).

Closure and demolition
At the start of the 1960s, the studio ran into serious difficulty with its financing. Unable to compete with other television studio production facilities, it ceased trading and was closed permanently in March 1961. Most of its equipment was sold to the nearby Shepperton Studios, and some of its 200 former employees transferred there.

The majority of the studio's buildings were demolished in the early 1960s and the site was sold for house building. Today, all that remains of the studio is the power generating house, originally built by Hepworth, which was converted into a theatre in 1925. It is now known as the Walton Playhouse, and is primarily used for amateur dramatics.

Selected filmography

Hepworth era
1900: The Beggar's Deceit
1900: How It Feels to Be Run Over
1900: Explosion of a Motor Car
1903: Alice in Wonderland
1905: Rescued by Rover
1905: Baby's Toilet
1913: David Copperfield
1915: The Baby on the Barge
1916: Annie Laurie
1919: City of Beautiful Nonsense
1919: Broken in the Wars
1919: The Forest on the Hill
1920: Helen of Four Gates
1921: The Narrow Valley
1921: Tansy
1921: Wild Heather
1923: Comin' Thro the Rye
1923: Mist in the Valley

Nettlefold era
1951: Madame Louise
1951: Scrooge
1952: The Pickwick Papers
1952: Escape Route
1953: Albert R.N.
1953: Forces' Sweetheart
1955: Stock Car
1955: Escapade
1955: Miss Tulip Stays the Night
1956: A Touch of the Sun
1956: Radio Cab Murder

Walton Studios era
1956: Bond of Fear
1957: The Naked Truth
1958: Tread Softly Stranger
1959: Don't Panic Chaps!
1959: The Navy Lark (film)
1959: Cover Girl Killer
1960: Beyond the Curtain
1960: Mary Had a Little...
1961: During One Night

References

British film studios
Television studios in England